The 466th Air Expeditionary Group of the United States Air Force provides support for airmen at stations across Afghanistan. This includes "joint expeditionary tasking" airmen, airmen whose units are assigned to a headquarters other than the one from United States Air Force during their deployment. It also includes individual augmentees assigned to joint organizations. The 466th has been headquartered at Al Udeid Air Base, Qatar since 2014, when it moved from the Transit Center at Manas. The group provides a lifeline, referred to as a "Blue Line' back to the Air Force. Its two squadrons, the 466th and 966th Air Expeditionary Squadrons are still located in Afghanistan.

The 466th's mission was formerly performed by the now inactive 755th Air Expeditionary Group.

Mission
The 466th supports the International Security Assistance Force's campaign in Afghanistan by ensuring airmen are taken care of while they are "loaned out" through tactical control to non-Air Force units executing joint missions. It is responsible for over 1,300 airmen at 48 different locations in Afghanistan so that none of those Airmen become isolated from the Air Force. It processes airmen arriving in theater to insure they are properly briefed and equipped for the mission they will be performing while deployed.

Unit description
The 466th AEG is composed of airmen from more than 56 Air Force Specialty Codes including security forces, explosive ordnance disposal, civil engineering, contracting, communications, medical, intelligence, legal and logistics support to train local officials and rebuild the country.

History

The group was constituted as the 466th Bombardment Group (Heavy) and activated on 1 August 1943 at Alamogordo Army Air Field, New Mexico with the 784th, 785th, 786th and 787th Bombardment Squadrons assigned. Personnel started training with Consolidated B-24 Liberators at Kearns Army Air Field in Utah at the end of August 1943, remaining there until late November when the unit retr\urned to Alamogordo. In February 1944 they moved to Topeka Army Air Field Kansas for a week before beginning the trip overseas to England.

The air echelon took the southern ferry route and arrived at RAF Attlebridge England, in March 1944. At Attlebridge the group became part of Eighth Air Force. The 466th was assigned to the 96th Combat Bombardment Wing. Their group tail code was "Circle-L".

The 466th began operations on 22 March 1944 by participating in a daylight raid on Berlin. The group attacked targets including marshalling yards at Liège and Saarbrücken, airfields at St Trond and Chartres, a repair and assembly plant at Reims, factories at Brunswick, oil refineries at Bohlen, aircraft plants at Kempten, mineral works at Hamburg, a synthetic oil plant at Misburg, a fuel depot at Dülmen, and aircraft engine works at Eisenach.

Other operations included attacking pillboxes along the coast of Normandy on D-Day, 6 June 1944, and afterwards striking interdiction targets behind the beachhead. It bombed enemy positions at Saint-Lô during Operation Cobra, the Allied breakthrough in July 1944. It hauled oil and gasoline to Allied forces advancing across France in September. It attacked German communications and transportation during the Battle of the Bulge from December 1944 to January 1945 and bombed the airfield at Nordhorn in support of Operation Varsity, the airborne assault across the Rhine on 24 March 1945.

The 466th flew its last combat mission on 25 April 1945, striking a transformer station at Traunstein. During combat operations, the 785th Bomb Squadron flew 55 consecutive missions without loss. The group flew 232 combat missions with 5,762 sorties dropping 12,914 tons of bombs. They lost 47 aircraft in combat.

The group redeployed to the United States during June and July 1945. The air echelon departed Attlebridge in mid-June 1945. The ground units sailed from Greenock on the RMS Queen Mary on 6 June 1945. They arrived in New York on 11 July 1945. The group was then established at Sioux Falls Army Air Field South Dakota in July and was redesignated the 466th Bombardment Group, Very Heavy in August 1945 and was equipped with Boeing B-29 Superfortress aircraft. The group was transferred to Pueblo, Colorado, and then later to Davis–Monthan Field, Arizona for Superfortress training and programmed for deployment to the Pacific Theater. With the end of the war the Group was inactivated on 17 October 1945.

Expeditionary operations
The group was converted to provisional status as the 466th Air Expeditionary Group in 2009. In May 2009, the group was activated as the mission being performed by the 466th Air Expeditionary Squadron was expanding. The 466th Squadron was assigned to the group and three additional squadrons were activated to support the growing number of airmen supporting Provincial Reconstruction Teams, embedded training teams and brigade support teams. Each of the four squadrons was responsible for airmen within one of the International Security Assistance Force’s regional commands. The 466th Squadron at Kandahar Airfield served Train Advise Assist Command - South and Train Advise Assist Command - West, the 766th Squadron covered Train Advise Assist Command - East, the 866th Train Advise Assist Command - Capital, while the 966th was responsible for Train Advise Assist Command - North.

In 2011, as operations in Afghanistan diminished, the group's 766th Air Expeditionary Squadron, which had been responsible for airmen in Train Advise Assist Command – East, was inactivated and the 966th Squadron added this responsibility to its existing oversight in Train Advise Assist Command – North.

Lineage
 Constituted as the 466th Bombardment Group (Heavy)' on 19 May 1943
 Activated on 1 August 1943
 Redesignated 466th Bombardment Group (Very Heavy) in August 1945
 Inactivated on 17 October 1945
 Converted to provisional status, redesignated 466th Air Expeditionary Group and assigned to United States Air Forces Central Command to activate as needed.
 Activated c. May 2009
 Inactivated unknown
 Activated 26 November 2012

Assignments
 IV Bomber Command, 1 August 1943 – February 1944
 96th Combat Bombardment Wing, 7 March 1944 – 6 July 1945
 Second Air Force, 15 July – 17 October 1945
 455th Air Expeditionary Wing, May 2009 – unknown
 9th Air Expeditionary Task Force, 26 November 2012 – present

Components
 466th Air Expeditionary Squadron, May 2009 – unknown, 26 November 2012 – December 2014
 Kandahar Airfield
 766th Air Expeditionary Squadron, May 2009 – 23 March 2011.
 Forward Operating Base Sharana
 784th Bombardment Squadron, 1 August 1943 – 17 October 1945
 785th Bombardment Squadron, 1 August 1943 – 17 October 1945
 786th Bombardment Squadron, 1 August 1943 – 17 October 1945
 787th Bombardment Squadron, 1 August 1943 – 17 October 1945
 866th Air Expeditionary Squadron, 1 May 2009 – unknown
 Camp Phoenix, Kabul
 966th Air Expeditionary Squadron, May 2009 – unknown, 26 November 2012 – Present –
 Bagram Air Base Currently responsible for all JET/IA Airmen in Afghanistan

Commanders
 Col John D. Cline, USAF (12 Nov – 13 Oct)
 Col Timothy G. Lee, USAF (13 Oct – 14 Aug)
 Col Scott M. Guilbeault, USAF (14–15 Aug)
 Col Brian D. Burns, USAF (15 Aug – Present)

Stations
 Alamogordo Army Air Field, New Mexico, 1 August 1943
 Kearns Army Air Field, Utah 31 August 1943
 Alamogordo Army Airfield, New Mexico, 1 August 1943
 Topeka Army Air Field, Kansas, 5–13 February 1944
 RAF Attlebridge (AAF-120), England 7 March 1944 – 6 July 1945
 Sioux Falls Army Air Field, South Dakota, 15 July 1945
 Pueblo Army Air Base, Colorado, 25 July 1945
 Davis–Monthan Field, Arizona, 15 August – 17 October 1945
 Bagram Air Base, May 2009 – November 2012
 Transit Center at Manas, Kyrgyzstan, 26 November 2012 – February 2014
 Al Udeid Air Base, Qatar, February 2014 – Present

Aircraft
 Consolidated B-24 Liberator, 1943–1945
 Boeing B-29 Superfortress, 1945

Notes

References

 Childers, Thomas. Wings of Morning: The Story of the Last American Bomber Shot Down over Germany in World War II. Reading, Massachusetts: Addison-Wesley Pub. Co., 1995. .
 Freeman, Roger A. Airfields of the Eighth: Then and Now. After the Battle, 1978. .
 Freeman, Roger A. The Mighty Eighth: The Colour Record. Cassell & Co., 1991. .
 Maurer, Maurer. Air Force Combat Units of World War II. Maxwell Air Force Base, Alabama: Office of Air Force History, 1983. .
 Woolnough, John H. Attlebridge Diaries: The History of the 466th Bombardment Group (Heavy). Hollywood, Florida: 8th Air Force News, 1979 (Reprinted 1985 by Sunflower University Press. Second Expanded Edition Dallas, Texas: Taylor Pub., 1995).

External links

 Bagram officials stand up 4 new squadrons
 466 AEG Factsheet Link
 455th AEW's Bagram Airfield Official Site
 Bagram Airbase at GlobalSecurity.org
 466 AEG JET Airman 2014 from AF Combat Camera

Air expeditionary groups of the United States Air Force